A statue of King Leopold II of the Belgians was installed in Ekeren, Flanders, Belgium, until 2020.  The statue was designed by Belgian sculptor Joseph Ducaju, made of sandstone from Bad Bentheim, and was erected in 1873, eight years into Leopold's reign, as the first statue to commemorate him as king.

After damage sustained during the George Floyd protests, the statue was removed to the grounds of the Middelheim Open Air Sculpture Museum in Antwerp on 9 June, although it may be irreparably damaged.

See also

 Bust of Leopold II of Belgium, Ghent
 King Leopold II statue (Ostend)
 List of monuments and memorials removed during the George Floyd protests
 List of statues of Leopold II of Belgium

References

External links
 

1873 establishments in Belgium
1873 sculptures
2020 disestablishments in Belgium
Leopold II of Belgium
Monuments and memorials in Belgium
Monuments and memorials removed during the George Floyd protests
Outdoor sculptures in Belgium
Sandstone sculptures
Sculptures of men in Belgium
Statues in Belgium
Vandalized works of art
Statues removed in 2020